Tusk is a restaurant serving Mediterranean and Middle Eastern cuisine in Portland, Oregon's Buckman neighborhood, in the United States. The restaurant opened in 2016.

See also
 List of Middle Eastern restaurants

References

External links

 
 
 Tusk at Portland Monthly
 Tusk at Zagat
 Tusk at Zomato

2016 establishments in Oregon
Asian restaurants in Portland, Oregon
Buckman, Portland, Oregon
Mediterranean restaurants in Oregon
Middle Eastern-American culture in Portland, Oregon
Middle Eastern restaurants in the United States
Restaurants established in 2016